Joseph Coleman may refer to:

 Joseph E. Coleman (1922–2000), American politician, attorney and chemist
 Joseph James Coleman (1838–1888), credited with invention of a mechanical dry-air refrigeration process
 Joseph T. Coleman, American football player and coach